Kiliki or Kilikili is a fictional language originally created by Madhan Karky for the 2015 Indian epic adventure film Baahubali: The Beginning. It has 3000 words and is written using 22 symbols. In February 2020 on International Mother Language Day, the film's director SS Rajamouli launched the official website of Kiliki. It reportedly has 40 grammar rules but the grammar section of the website is empty.

Usage
In the film Baahubali: The Beginning, the Kalakeya tribe speak Kiliki. After the success of the film in December 2015, singer Smita released "Baha Kiliki", the first song in Kiliki language, onto YouTube. It has over 108 millions views. In 2017, it was used in the film Baahubali 2: The Conclusion, the sequel of Baahubali: The Beginning.

See also 

 Fictional language
 List of constructed languages

References

External links
Kiliki official website

Fictional languages
Constructed languages introduced in the 2010s
2015 introductions
Baahubali (franchise)
Constructed languages